Harsent is a surname. Notable people with the surname include:

 David Harsent (born 1942), English poet
 Rose Harsent (died 1902), English murder victim
 Simon Harsent (born 1965), English fine art and commercial photographer, son of David

English-language surnames